Seven-time defending champion David Wagner and his partner Andrew Lapthorne defeated Dylan Alcott and Bryan Barten in the final, 7–5, 6–2 to win the quad doubles wheelchair tennis title at the 2017 US Open.

Nick Taylor and Wagner were the seven-time reigning champions, but Taylor did not participate this year.

The event was not held in 2016 due to a scheduling conflict with the 2016 Summer Paralympics.

Draw

Final

External links
 Draw

Wheelchair Quad Doubles
U.S. Open, 2015 Quad Doubles